Events in the year 2010 in Chad.

Incumbents 

 President: Idriss Déby
 Prime Minister: Youssouf Saleh Abbas (until March 5th), Emmanuel Nadingar (from March 5th onwards)

Events

January 

 January 15 – The Chadian Civil War (2005–2010) ends.

May 

 May 14 – Chad gives The United Nations International Atomic Energy Agency (IAEA) access to information about its nuclear programs and involvements.
 May 26 – UN peacekeeping forces agree to pull out of Chad by the end of the year.

July 

 July 21 – Chadian government refuses to arrest Sudanese president, Omar al-Bashir, despite being legally obligated to arrest the figure with a warrant out for his arrest.
 July-September – Flooding in Chad causes 70,000 people to be displaced from their homes.

November 

 Chad continues to struggle against a Cholera outbreak, hitting 5,000 total recorded cases in the country.

References 

 
Years of the 21st century in Chad
2010s in Chad
Chad
Chad